Henri Lubatti is an American actor.

Life and career
Lubatti was born in Seattle, Washington, to Catherine Lubatti, a travel agency worker who is of French descent, and Henri Lubatti, Sr., a physics professor who is of Italian descent.

A graduate of the University of Washington Drama School, Lubatti made his feature film debut in the 1997 sports drama Prefontaine, which was filmed in Washington and co-starred Kurtwood Smith. He made his earliest television appearances while working in Vancouver, Canada in 1998. In that year, appeared in an episode of The X-Files entitled "Mind's Eye". This was followed by a guest spot on the series Millennium and Seven Days, directed by David Livingston. He moved to Los Angeles in 1999, where he acquired a recurring role on J. J. Abrams's Felicity.

Subsequent TV credits include guest appearances on Angel, Whoopi Goldberg's Strong Medicine, ER (in an episode with Sam Witwer), The Practice, and Enterprise. In 2002 he had a recurring role as Jovan Myovic on the first season of the hit series 24, during which time he worked alongside fellow Star Trek alumni Mina Badie, Jude Ciccolella, Zach Grenier, Penny Johnson, Glenn Morshower, and Wade Williams. He went on to appear on such shows as the new Dragnet (in an episode with Erick Avari and Richard Cox), CSI (with Robert Curtis-Brown), Medical Investigation (starring Neal McDonough), Bryan Singer's House M.D., and two episodes of The O.C. (including one with Michael Nouri). He also had a role in the 2000 Murder, She Wrote TV movie A Story to Die For, as did Steven Culp, Daniel Dae Kim, J. Patrick McCormack, and Duncan Regehr. He also had a guest role in the seventh season of the drama fantasy series Supernatural (U.S. TV series).

Lubatti also has a recurring role on the soap opera General Hospital and was a regular on the Showtime series Sleeper Cell, which debuted in 2005. His most recent film credit is 2005's My Big Fat Independent Movie, which also features Clint Howard. On January 11, 2014, it was announced that Lubatti had been cast as Lumière in the ABC fantasy series Once Upon a Time via Twitter.

References

External links
 
 
 

American people of French descent
American people of Italian descent
University of Washington School of Drama alumni
American male television actors
Living people
Male actors from Seattle
Year of birth missing (living people)